Hawley Field is a baseball field in Morgantown, West Virginia, United States.  Along with Appalachian Power Park in Charleston, West Virginia, it served as one of two home venues of the West Virginia Mountaineers baseball team before the new Monongalia County Ballpark opened in April 2015.  The stadium holds 1,500 spectators.

Hawley Field hosted the 1985 Atlantic 10 Conference baseball tournament, which the Mountaineers won on their home field.

Prior to the 2013 season, the facility's infield was resodded.

West Virginia joined the Big 12 Conference following the 2012 season.  Since Hawley Field does not meet Big 12 Conference standards, and the state legislature turned down a plan for a taxpayer funded replacement, the Mountaineers played three of their four 2013 home conference series at Appalachian Power Park in Charleston and one at Linda K. Epling Stadium in Beckley (160 and 185 miles from campus, respectively).  Non-conference games continued to be played at Hawley Field. In 2013, plans were announced to build a new venue in the nearby town of Granville for the Mountaineers baseball team. The new park, ultimately known as Monongalia County Ballpark, was originally scheduled to open at the start of the 2015 season, but weather-related construction delays forced the Mountaineers to play their first several 2015 home games in Washington, Pennsylvania until the new park opened that April.

In 2013, the Mountaineers ranked 50th among Division I baseball programs in attendance, averaging 1,328 per home game.

See also
 List of NCAA Division I baseball venues

References

External links
Venue information

West Virginia Mountaineers baseball
Defunct college baseball venues in the United States
West Virginia University campus
Tourist attractions in Monongalia County, West Virginia
1971 establishments in West Virginia
Sports venues completed in 1971
Baseball venues in West Virginia